Ammophila is the Latin name of two genera:

 Ammophila (plant), a genus of grasses in the family Poaceae
 Ammophila (wasp), a genus of insects in the family Sphecidae